Ratho railway stations served the village of Ratho, historically in the county of Midlothian, Scotland from 1842 to 1951 on the Edinburgh and Glasgow Railway and the North British Railway.

History

High Level 
The station opened on 18 December 1842 by the Edinburgh and Glasgow Railway on the main line. A village to the north was named after this station. In between the junction was the goods yard and on the eastbound platform was the goods yard. This was downgraded to a ground frame in 1939. The station closed on 18 June 1951.

Low Level 
This station opened on 1 March 1866 by the North British Railway on the South Queensferry branch line; it only had one platform. It was situated slightly north of the high level station. It closed on 22 September 1930.

References

External links 

Disused railway stations in Midlothian
Former North British Railway stations
Railway stations in Great Britain opened in 1842
Railway stations in Great Britain closed in 1951
1842 establishments in Scotland
1951 disestablishments in Scotland